Tanya C. Vyhovsky is an American social worker and politician who serves in the Vermont House of Representatives. A member of the Vermont Progressive Party, she represents the Chittenden-8-1 district.

Early life and education

Tanya Vyhovsky graduated from Essex High School in 2003. She graduated from Northeastern University with a Bachelor of Science in psychology and biology. She graduated from the University of Vermont with a master of social work degree in 2017. She married Jefferson Hales in 2015. Vyhovsky is of Ukrainian descent.

Career

Vyhovsky worked as a clinical social worker and school social worker in Essex, Vermont. She served on the board and was vice-president of the Vermont National Association of Social Workers from 2016 to 2020. Vyhovsky was endorsed by the Champlain Valley DSA chapter in her 2020 run.

Vermont House of Representatives

Vyhovsky ran for a seat in the Vermont House of Representatives and won the Progressive and Democratic nominations alongside Marybeth Redmond, but placed third out of three candidates behind Redmond and Linda K. Myers in the 2018 election.

Vyhovsky announced at an event held by Bernie Sanders that she would run for a seat in the state house again and during the campaign she was endorsed by Sanders. She won the Democratic nomination alongside Redmond and placed second out of five candidates in the 2020 election.

Political future 
Vyhovsky publicly considered running a “people-powered Democratic-socialist” campaign for U.S. Senate in the 2022 election to replacing retiring incumbent Patrick Leahy. Vyhovsky indicated that she would only run if Senator Bernie Sanders didn't get behind Representative Peter Welch, which she said would make the race unwinnable for her.

Electoral history

See also
List of Democratic Socialists of America who have held office in the United States

References

21st-century American politicians
21st-century American women politicians
American people of Ukrainian descent
Living people
Democratic Party members of the Vermont House of Representatives
Northeastern University alumni
University of Vermont alumni
Vermont Progressive Party politicians
Women state legislators in Vermont
Year of birth missing (living people)